St. Aloysius PU College, Harihar is a Catholic pre-university college in Harihar, Karnataka administered by the Mangalore Jesuit Educational Society. It is dedicated to St. Aloysius Gonzaga.

History
St. Aloysius Pre-University College is a sister concern of St. Aloysius College, also administered by the Mangalore Jesuit Educational Society. After June 2005 the college was housed at a premises provided by the Maria Nivas School in Harihar. Since May 2009, it has been housed in Amaravathi.

See also
 List of Jesuit sites

References  

Jesuit universities and colleges in India
Pre University colleges in Karnataka
Universities and colleges in Davanagere district
Educational institutions established in 2005
2005 establishments in Karnataka